This is a list of train surfing injuries and deaths.

Data of train surfing injuries and deaths 

* This entry is for deaths from train surfing that occurred from any time period of 5 years and is not linked to any specific year and could be a repeat of the same data for the other entries for the United Kingdom.

Descriptions of train surfing injuries and deaths 
In New York in the late 1980s and early 1990s it was reported that several people died train surfing 

In 2012 it was reported that in Indonesia dozens of people are killed or injured by train surfing every year. It was also reported in 2012 that there are one or two deaths per month in Indonesia from train surfing.

Train surfing injuries and deaths

See also 

 Car surfing
 Elevator surfing
 List of graffiti and street art injuries and deaths
 List of selfie-related injuries and deaths
 Skitching
 Train surfing

References 

Train surfing
Train surfing
Train surfing
Train surfing
Train surfing